Tedim ((Zo: Tedim Khawpi, pronounced ; is a town in and the administrative seat of Tedim Township, Chin State, in the north-western part of Burma. It is the second largest town in Chin State. The town's four major boroughs (vengte) are: Sakollam, Myoma, Lawibual and Leilum. The population is primarily Zomi.

History
The name "Tedim" was derived from a pool in the hills that used to twinkle in the sunlight. Therefore it was called te-dim (twinkling, shiny) in the local Zomi language. 

As the Zomi lacked a formal writing system in the past, the story of Tedim mostly depends on oral tradition. Establishment of Tedim is ascribed to Gui Mang II, a powerful prince from the then ruling Guite family in the region (c. 1600).  However, due to the untimely death of Gui Lun (the fifth generation from Gui Mang II), Tedim was deserted for two generations. By the time of Pum Go, Tedim was reestablished as the political base of the Guite family. At the time of Mang Suum II, son of Pum Go, the allied force of the Pawihangs began their advance in the region and attacked Tedim. Tedim was again deserted by many, though some local residents survived under the leadership of Mang Gin from the Hatlang family. In 1840, in order to secure peace, the remaining citizens invited the leadership of Kam Hau of Mualbem, of the emerging Sukte family, since they had good military and political ties with the Zahau family of the Pawis.

When British rule began in 1824, Tedim was chosen as the local residence for the District Officer.

Geography
The ranges of Hills of Thangmual include Kennedy's Peak, Lunglenkawl, the Rih Bual, the Hausapi, the Gullu Mual, the Zangmualli, the Tuikangpi, the Suangsuang, and the Lentangmual. There are dams, caves, peaks, and other attractions, including Lennupa Mual, the Twin Fairy Hill and other historic sites.

References

External links
 Tedim Bible (Android)
Tedim Bible (iOS)
Vaphual News in Tedim
English to Tedim/Zolai Dictionary
Zolai to English Dictionary and Zolai Grammar
Zomi Online Library 

Township capitals of Myanmar
Populated places in Chin State